Ward 1 Etobicoke North is a municipal electoral division in Etobicoke, Toronto, Ontario that has been represented in the Toronto City Council since the 2018 municipal election. It was last contested in 2022, with Vincent Crisanti being elected councillor.

History 
The ward was created in 2018 when the provincial government aligned Toronto's then-44 municipal wards with the 25 corresponding provincial and federal ridings. The current ward is an amalgamation of the old Ward 1 (northern section), the old Ward 2 (southern section).

2018 municipal election 
Ward 1 was first contested during the 2018 municipal election. Ward 2 incumbent Michael Ford, who was a Toronto District School Board trustee and the nephew of Premier Doug Ford, was elected with 42.26 per cent of the vote.

2022 municipal election 
Michael Ford resigned his seat in June 2022, after winning election to the Legislative Assembly of Ontario in the 2022 provincial election. Vincent Crisanti, who finished second behind Ford in 2018, and who had held Ward 1 prior to the amalgamation of Wards 1 and 2 in 2018, was elected.

Geography 
Etobicoke North is part of the Etobicoke and York community council. The ward occupies the northwestern part of Toronto. The eastern boundary is the Humber River from Steeles Avenue south to a point just to the east of the Dixon Road. The southern boundary runs west from the Humber River along Dixon Road to Martin Grove Road to Eglinton Avenue to the western limit of the city. The western and northern limits of the ridings are formed by the city limits.

The ward contains the neighbourhoods of Rexdale, The Elms, Humberwood, Kingsview Village, Thistletown, and Willowridge.

Councillors 

*Following Michael Ford's election as MPP, council proceeded to appoint an interim council. Rosemarie Bryan was appointed on June 24, 2022 but was not sworn in and resigning shortly after due to past homophobic remarks. She served on council for a total of about 5 hours, 40 minutes.

Election results

See also 

 Municipal elections in Canada
 Municipal government of Toronto
 List of Toronto municipal elections

References

External links 

 Councillor's webpage

Etobicoke
Toronto city council wards
2018 establishments in Ontario